Karina Anaís Rodríguez (born 2 March 1999) is an professional footballer who plays as a defender for Liga MX Femenil side Club América. Born in the United States, she represents the Mexico women's national team.

Early life
Rodríguez was born and raised in Torrance, California. She attended Torrance High School and the University of California, Los Angeles.

International career
Rodríguez represented the United States at the 2016 FIFA U-17 Women's World Cup and the 2018 CONCACAF Women's U-20 Championship. She later switched allegiance to Mexico and made her senior debut on 24 February 2021 in a 0–0 friendly home draw against Costa Rica.

Honors
United States
 CONCACAF Women's U-17 Championship: 2016

Personal life
Rodríguez's older sister Anika Rodríguez has also played for the Mexico women's national football team.

References

1999 births
Living people
Citizens of Mexico through descent
Mexican women's footballers
Women's association football defenders
Mexico women's international footballers
Soccer players from Torrance, California
American women's soccer players
UCLA Bruins women's soccer players
Washington Spirit players
National Women's Soccer League players
United States women's under-20 international soccer players
American sportspeople of Mexican descent